This is a list of wealthy Arabs ranked by net worth. It is based on an annual assessment of wealth and assets by Forbes Middle East.

Top 22 richest Arabs
According to Forbes Middle East, as of April 2021, the 22 wealthiest Arabs are as follows:

See also
 List of wealthiest families

References 

Arab League
Economy of the Arab League
Arabs
Net Worth